Sheykhabad-e Yolmeh Salian (also Romanized as Sheykhābād-e Yolmeh Sālīān; also known as Sheykhābād) is a village in Mazraeh-ye Shomali Rural District, Voshmgir District, Aqqala County, Golestan Province, Iran. At the 2006 census, its population was 203, in 44 families.

References 

Populated places in Aqqala County